Silajāņi Parish is an administrative unit of Preiļi Municipality in the Latgale region of Latvia. At the beginning of 2014, the population of the parish was 456. The administrative center is Silajāņi village.

Towns, villages and settlements of Silajāņi parish 
 Bikova
 Kotļerova
 Rozalina
 Silajāņi

References 

Parishes of Latvia
Preiļi Municipality
Latgale